Cho Hae-lyeum (born February 27, 1985 in Daejeon, South Korea) is a South Korean figure skater. She is the 2002 South Korean national champion.

Results

External links
 

South Korean female single skaters
1985 births
Living people
Figure skaters at the 2003 Asian Winter Games
Competitors at the 2003 Winter Universiade
Sportspeople from Daejeon
21st-century South Korean women